Magnolia Municipal Airport  is three miles southeast of Magnolia, in Columbia County, Arkansas.

Trans-Texas Airways Douglas DC-3s stopped at Magnolia, one of many stops on a route between Dallas and Memphis from 1953-54 to 1962.

Facilities
Its one runway, 18/36, is 5,008 by 100 feet (1,526 x 30 m).

In the year ending June 30, 2008 the airport had 10,400 aircraft operations, average 28 per day: 96% general aviation, 2% air taxi, and 2% military. 13 aircraft were then based at the airport: 77% single-engine, 15% multi-engine and 8% helicopter.

References

External links 
 Aerial photo as of 8 April 2000 from USGS The National Map
 
 

Airports in Arkansas
Buildings and structures in Columbia County, Arkansas
Transportation in Columbia County, Arkansas